The 1993 Lafayette Leopards football team was an American football team that represented Lafayette College during the 1993 NCAA Division I-AA football season. Lafayette finished second in the Patriot League.

In their 13th year under head coach Bill Russo, the Leopards compiled a 5–4–2 record. Chris Flood, Pete Ohnegian, Dave Pyne and Mark Reardon were the team captains.

The Leopards outscored opponents 270 to 214. Lafayette's 3–1–1 conference record placed second in the six-team Patriot League standings.

Lafayette played its home games at Fisher Field on College Hill in Easton, Pennsylvania.

Schedule

References

Lafayette
Lafayette Leopards football seasons
Lafayette Leopards football